Gavin Grant may refer to:

Gavin Grant (editor), science fiction editor and writer
Gavin Grant (executive) (born 1955), chief executive of the RSPCA
Gavin Grant (footballer) (born 1984), English footballer